USK Praha (official name: ZVVZ USK Praha) is a Czech women's basketball club that was founded in 1953 in the city of Prague. USK Praha plays in the Czech League, the highest competition in the Czech Republic. It is a 21-times national champion. On the international scene, the greatest success was the win of the Ronchetti Cup in the 1975/76 season, of the EuroLeague in the 2014/15 season and subsequently of the FIBA SuperCup in 2015.

Since 2014, its home is Královka Arena. Before, this team inhabited Folimanka hall.

Honours

Domestic
National Championships – 17
Czechoslovak Women's Basketball Championship:
Winners (8) : 1970, 1973, 1982, 1983, 1984, 1985, 1988, 1989
Runner up (7) : 1971, 1972, 1975, 1981, 1986, 1987, 1990
Czech Women's Basketball League:
Winners (16) : 1993, 1994, 1995, 2009, 2011, 2012, 2013, 2014, 2015, 2016, 2017, 2018, 2019, 2020, 2021, 2022
Runner up (10) : 1996, 1997, 2001, 2002, 2003, 2005, 2006, 2007, 2008, 2010

National Cups – 4
Czech Women's Basketball Cup:
Winners (4) : 2010, 2011, 2012, 2014
Runner up (14) : 1996, 1997, 1998, 1999, 2000, 2001, 2002, 2003, 2004, 2005, 2007, 2008, 2009, 2013

International
International titles –2
Europe SuperCup Women:
Winners (1) : 2015
EuroLeague Women:
Winners (1) : 2015
Ronchetti Cup:
Winners (1) : 1976
Runner up (1) : 1973

Famous players
  Milka Bjelica
  Laia Palau
  Sonja Petrović
  Jana Veselá

See also
USK Praha

References

External links
Official website
Profile at eurobasket.com

Women's basketball teams in the Czech Republic
Basketball teams established in 1953
Sport in Prague